William Ekron Bowman Jr. (September 22, 1931 – February 7, 2008) was a professional American football player who played fullback in the National Football League (NFL) for the Detroit Lions and the Pittsburgh Steelers.

References

External links
 

1931 births
2008 deaths
Players of American football from Birmingham, Alabama
American football fullbacks
William & Mary Tribe football players
William & Mary Tribe men's basketball players 
Detroit Lions players
Pittsburgh Steelers players
San Francisco 49ers players 
American men's basketball players